Acantholimon collare is a species of flowering plant in the Plumbaginaceae family described by Mogens Engell Köie and Karl Heinz Rechinger. The native range of this species is North East Iran. A phytochemical analysis from the University of Birjand found that the antimicrobial nature of compounds found in A. collare make it potentially suitable for pharmaceutical use.

See also 
 List of Acantholimon species

References

External links 
 theplantlist.org

collare
Flora of Iran
Plants described in 1955